Selce is a village in Croatia. It is connected by the D8 highway.

Populated places in Primorje-Gorski Kotar County